Francisco José Barnés de Castro (born 11 September 1946, in Mexico City) is a Mexican academic and consultant. From 6 January 1997 to 12 November 1999 he served as rector of the National Autonomous University of Mexico (UNAM), the largest university in the Spanish-speaking world.

Barnés de Castro graduated with a bachelor's degree in chemical engineering from the National Autonomous University of Mexico and received both a master's degree and a doctorate degree in the same discipline from University of California, Berkeley. He is a long-standing academic and researcher at the National Autonomous University, where he has led the Faculty of Chemistry and served as rector until a major student strike, provoked by his proposal to significantly increase its tuition, forced him to resign.

In the public sector, he has served as Undersecretary of Hydrocarbons and Undersecretary of Energy Policy Technological Development at the Mexican Secretariat of Energy, as Director-General of the Mexican Petroleum Institute and Commissioner of the Energy Regulatory Commission. Overseas, he has worked as an international consultant for the Pacific Northwest National Laboratory of the U.S. Department of Energy and in the Joint Public Consultative Committee of the Commission for Environmental Cooperation of North America.

Barnés de Castro has authored more than 27 articles, proceedings and papers in specialized journals and over 15 on educational subjects. He has chaired the Mexican Institute of Chemical Engineers, the Mexican Chemical Society, the National College of Chemical Engineers and Chemists and he is a member of the Mexican Academy of Engineering.

References

National Autonomous University of Mexico alumni
UC Berkeley College of Chemistry alumni
Academic staff of the National Autonomous University of Mexico
Mexican chemical engineers
People from Mexico City
Living people
1946 births